Irene van der Reijken (born 13 August 1993, Rotterdam) is a Dutch track and field athlete who specializes in the 3000 metres steeplechase.

On 3 June 2021 she set her current personal best in the 3000 metres steeplechase of 9:27.38 during the 2021 Meeting Iberoamericano de Atletismo, which qualified her for the 2020 Summer Olympics.

Personal Bests

Outdoor

3000 meter steeplechase - 9:27.38 (Huelva 4 June 2021) "NR"

References

Dutch female steeplechase runners
1993 births
Living people
Athletes from Rotterdam
Athletes (track and field) at the 2020 Summer Olympics
Olympic athletes of the Netherlands
21st-century Dutch women